Macbeth ( – 15 August 1057) was King of Scots from 1040 until his death. He ruled over the Kingdom of Alba, which covered only a portion of present-day Scotland.

Little is known about Macbeth's early life, although he was the son of Findláech of Moray and may have been a grandson of Malcolm II. He became Mormaer of Moray – a semi-autonomous province – in 1032, and was probably responsible for the death of the previous mormaer, Gille Coemgáin. He subsequently married Gille Coemgáin's widow, Gruoch, but they had no children together.

In 1040, Duncan I launched an attack into Moray and was killed in action by Macbeth's troops. Macbeth succeeded him as King of Alba, apparently with little opposition. His 17-year reign was mostly peaceful, although in 1054 he was faced with an English invasion, led by Siward, Earl of Northumbria, on behalf of Edward the Confessor. Macbeth was killed at the Battle of Lumphanan in 1057 by forces loyal to the future Malcolm III. He was buried on Iona, the traditional resting place of Scottish kings.

Macbeth was initially succeeded by his stepson Lulach, but Lulach ruled for only a few months before also being killed by Malcolm III, whose descendants ruled Scotland until the late 13th century. Macbeth is today best known as the main character of William Shakespeare's tragedy Macbeth and the many works that it has inspired. However, Shakespeare's Macbeth is based on Holinshed's Chronicles (published in 1577) and is not historically accurate.

Name 
The name Mac Bethad, from which the anglicised "MacBeth" is derived, means "son of life". Although it has the appearance of a Gaelic patronymic it does not have any meaning of filiation but instead carries an implication of "righteous man" or "religious man". An alternative proposed derivation is that it is a corruption of macc-bethad meaning "one of the elect".

Royal ancestry 
Some sources make Macbeth a grandson of King Malcolm II and thus a cousin to Duncan I, whom he succeeded. He was possibly also a cousin to Thorfinn the Mighty, Earl of Orkney and Caithness.  Nigel Tranter, in his novel Macbeth the King, went so far as to portray Macbeth as Thorfinn's half-brother, and Dorothy Dunnett portrays Macbeth and Thorfinn as a single individual (Macbeth being a baptismal name) in the novel King Hereafter. However, this is speculation arising from the lack of historical certainty regarding the number of daughters that Malcolm had.

Mormaer and dux 
When Cnut the Great came north in 1031 to accept the submission of King Malcolm II, Macbeth too submitted to him:
 Some have seen this as a sign of Macbeth's power; others have seen his presence, together with Iehmarc, who may be Echmarcach mac Ragnaill, as proof that Malcolm II was overlord of Moray and of the Kingdom of the Isles. Whatever the true state of affairs in the early 1030s, it seems more probable that Macbeth was subject to the king of Alba, Malcolm II, who died at Glamis, on 25 November 1034. The Prophecy of Berchán, apparently alone in near-contemporary sources, says that Malcolm died a violent death: calling it a "kinslaying" without actually naming his killers. Tigernach's chronicle says only:

Malcolm II's grandson Duncan (Donnchad mac Crínáin), later King Duncan I, was acclaimed as king of Alba on 30 November 1034, apparently without opposition. Duncan appears to have been tánaise ríg, the king in waiting, so that far from being an abandonment of tanistry, as has sometimes been argued, his kingship was a vindication of the practice. Previous successions had involved strife between various rígdomna  men of royal blood. Far from being the aged King Duncan of Shakespeare's play, the real King Duncan was a young man in 1034, and even at his death in 1040 his youthfulness is remarked upon.

Duncan's early reign was apparently uneventful. His later reign, in line with his description as "the man of many sorrows" in the Prophecy of Berchán, was not successful. In 1039, Strathclyde was attacked by the Northumbrians, and a retaliatory raid led by Duncan against Durham turned into a disaster. Duncan survived the defeat, but the following year he led an army north into Moray, Macbeth's domain, apparently on a punitive expedition against Moray. There he was killed in action, at the battle of Bothnagowan, now Pitgaveny, near Elgin, by the men of Moray led by Macbeth, probably on 14 August 1040.

King of Alba 
On Duncan's death, Macbeth became king. Had his reign not been universally accepted, resistance would have been expected, but none is known to have occurred. In 1045, Duncan's father Crínán of Dunkeld (a scion of the Scottish branch of the Cenél Conaill and Hereditary Abbot of Iona) was killed in a battle between two Scottish armies. Duncan's younger brother Maldred of Allerdale is believed to have died in the same battle, the family fighting Macbeth in defence of Duncan I's young son Malcolm III.

John of Fordun wrote that Duncan's wife fled Scotland, taking her children, including the future kings Malcolm III (Máel Coluim mac Donnchada) and Donald III (Domnall Bán mac Donnchada, or Donalbane) with her. On the basis of the author's beliefs as to whom Duncan married, various places of exile, Northumbria and Orkney among them, have been proposed. However, E. William Robertson proposes the safest place for Duncan's widow and her children would be with her or Duncan's kin and supporters in Atholl.

After the defeat of Crínán, Macbeth was evidently unchallenged. Marianus Scotus tells how the king made a pilgrimage to Rome in 1050, where, Marianus says, he gave money to the poor as if it were seed.

Karl Hundason 
The Orkneyinga Saga says that a dispute between Thorfinn Sigurdsson, Earl of Orkney, and Karl Hundason began when Karl Hundason became "King of Scots" and claimed Caithness. The identity of Karl Hundason, unknown to Scots and Irish sources, has long been a matter of dispute, and it is far from clear that the matter is settled. The most common assumption is that Karl Hundason was an insulting byname (Old Norse for "Churl, son of a Dog") given to Macbeth by his enemies. William Forbes Skene's suggestion that he was Duncan I of Scotland has been revived in recent years. Lastly, the idea that the whole affair is a poetic invention has been raised.

According to the Orkneyinga Saga, in the war which followed, Thorfinn defeated Karl in a sea-battle off Deerness at the east end of the Orkney Mainland. Then Karl's nephew Mutatan or Muddan, appointed to rule Caithness for him, was killed at Thurso by Thorkel the Fosterer. Finally, a great battle at Tarbat Ness on the south side of the Dornoch Firth ended with Karl defeated and fugitive or dead. Thorfinn, the saga says, then marched south through Scotland as far as Fife, burning and plundering as he passed. A later note in the saga claims that Thorfinn won nine Scottish earldoms.

Whoever Karl Hundason may have been, it appears that the saga is reporting a local conflict with a Scots ruler of Moray or Ross:

Final years 
In 1052, Macbeth was involved indirectly in the strife in the Kingdom of England between Godwin, Earl of Wessex and Edward the Confessor when he received a number of Norman exiles from England in his court, perhaps becoming the first king of Scots to introduce feudalism to Scotland. In 1054, Edward's Earl of Northumbria, Siward, led a very large invasion of Scotland (Duncan's widow and Malcolm's mother, Suthed, was Northumbrian-born; it is probable but not proven that there was a family tie between Siward and Malcolm). The campaign led to a bloody battle at Dunsinnan, in which the Annals of Ulster reported 3,000 Scots and 1,500 English dead; which can be taken as meaning very many on both sides. One of Siward's sons and a son-in-law were among the dead. The result of the invasion was that one Máel Coluim, "son of the king of the Cumbrians" (not to be confused with Máel Coluim mac Donnchada, the future Malcolm III of Scotland) was restored to his throne, i.e., as ruler of the kingdom of Strathclyde. It may be that the events of 1054 are responsible for the idea, which appears in Shakespeare's play, that Malcolm III was put in power by the English.

Macbeth did not survive the English invasion for long, for he was defeated and mortally wounded or killed by the future Malcolm III ("King Malcolm Ceann-mor", son of Duncan I) on the north side of the Mounth in 1057, after retreating with his men over the Cairnamounth Pass to take his last stand at the battle at Lumphanan. The Prophecy of Berchán has it that he was wounded and died at Scone, sixty miles to the south, some days later. Macbeth's stepson Lulach was installed as king soon after.

Unlike later writers, no near-contemporary source remarks on Macbeth as a tyrant. The Duan Albanach, which survives in a form dating to the reign of Malcolm III, calls him "Mac Bethad the renowned". The Prophecy of Berchán, a verse history which purports to be a prophecy, describes him as "the generous king of Fortriu", and says:

Life to legend 

Macbeth's life, like that of King Duncan I, had progressed far towards legend by the end of the 14th century, when John of Fordun and Andrew of Wyntoun wrote their histories. Hector Boece, Walter Bower, and George Buchanan all contributed to the legend.

William Shakespeare's depiction and its influence 

In Shakespeare's play, which is based mainly upon Raphael Holinshed's account, Macbeth is initially a valiant and loyal general to the elderly King Duncan. After being manipulated by Three Witches and his wife, Lady Macbeth, Macbeth murders Duncan and usurps the throne. Ultimately, the prophecies of the witches prove misleading, and Macbeth becomes a murderous tyrant. Duncan's son Malcolm stages a revolt against Macbeth, during which a guilt-ridden Lady Macbeth commits suicide. During battle, Macbeth encounters Macduff, a refugee nobleman whose wife and children had earlier been murdered on Macbeth's orders. Upon realising that he will die if he duels with Macduff, Macbeth at first refuses to do so. But when Macduff explains that if Macbeth surrenders he will be subjected to ridicule by his former subjects, Macbeth vows, "I will not yield to kiss the ground before young Malcolm's feet, to be baited by a rabble's curse." He chooses instead to fight Macduff to the death. Macduff kills and beheads Macbeth, and the play ends with Prince Malcolm becoming king.

The likely reason for Shakespeare's unflattering depiction of Macbeth is that King James VI and I was descended from Malcolm III via the House of Bruce and his own House of Stewart, whereas Macbeth's line died out with the death of Lulach six months after his step-father. King James was also thought to be a descendant of Banquo through Walter Stewart, 6th High Steward of Scotland.

In a 1959 essay, Boris Pasternak compared Shakespeare's characterisation of Macbeth to Raskolnikov, the protagonist of Crime and Punishment by Fyodor Dostoevsky. Pasternak explained that neither character begins as a murderer, but becomes one by a set of faulty rationalisations and a belief that he is above the law.

Lady Macbeth has also become famous in her own right. In his 1865 novel Lady Macbeth of the Mtsensk District, Nikolai Leskov updated The Tragedy of Macbeth so that it takes place among the Imperial Russian merchant class. In an ironic twist, however, Leskov reverses the gender roles – the woman is the murderer and the man is the instigator. Leskov's novel was the basis for Dmitri Shostakovich's 1936 opera of the same name.

Other depictions 
In modern times, Dorothy Dunnett's novel King Hereafter aims to portray a historical Macbeth, but proposes that Macbeth and his rival and sometime ally, Thorfinn of Orkney, are one and the same (Thorfinn is his birth name and Macbeth his baptismal name). John Cargill Thompson's play Macbeth Speaks 1997, a reworking of his earlier Macbeth Speaks, is a monologue delivered by the historical Macbeth, aware of what Shakespeare and posterity have done to him. Scottish author Nigel Tranter based one of his historical novels, MacBeth the King, on the historical figure. David Greig's 2010 play Dunsinane takes Macbeth's downfall at Dunsinane as its starting point, with his reign portrayed as long and stable, in contrast to Malcolm's. British Touring Shakespeare also produced in 2010 A Season Before the Tragedy of Macbeth by dramatist Gloria Carreño describing events from the murder of "Lord Gillecomgain", Gruoch Macbeth's first husband, to the fateful letter in the first act of Shakespeare's tragedy.

Macbeth appears as a character in the television series Gargoyles with the Gargoyle Demona playing a crucial role in both his rise and fall as King of Scotland. He was voiced by John Rhys-Davies.

References

Sources

Further reading 

Tranter, Nigel MacBeth the King Hodder & Stoughton, 1978.
Aitchison, Nick Macbeth Sutton Publishing, 2001, .
Dunnett, Dorothy King Hereafter Knopf, 1982, .
Ellis, Peter Berresford Macbeth: High King of Scotland 1040–57 Learning Links, 1991, .
Gregg, William H. Controversial issues in Scottish history Putnam, 1910.
Marsden, John Alba of the Ravens: In Search of the Celtic Kingdom of the Scots Constable, 1997, .
Walker, Ian Lords of Alba Sutton Publishing, 2006, .

External links 
 Macbeth at the official website of the British monarchy
 Macbeth at BBC History

1000s births
Year of birth uncertain
1057 deaths
House of Moray
Macbeth
11th-century Scottish monarchs
Monarchs killed in action
Scottish pre-union military personnel killed in action
Burials at Iona Abbey
Mormaers of Moray
Gaelic monarchs in Scotland
11th-century mormaers